Víctor Manuel Fernández Gutiérrez (born 17 April 1974), known simply as Víctor, is a Spanish former professional footballer. Usually a striker, he could also be put to use behind a sole attacker.

Over 18 seasons, he appeared in 561 matches both major levels of Spanish football combined, scoring 167 goals (342 games and 93 goals in La Liga). He played nine years with Valladolid (two spells), and four with Villarreal.

Playing career

Club
Víctor was born in Mérida, Extremadura. A product of CD Leganés' youth system, he made his senior debut with Real Madrid Castilla, and first appeared in La Liga with CD Tenerife, having little success in a one-and-a-half season stint. Towards the end of the second year, he played with CD Toledo in the second division.

In 1996–97, Víctor joined Real Valladolid, scoring 16 top-flight goals in his debut campaign to help the club rank seventh, then spent another four years with Villarreal CF, where he was also a regular fixture (with a combined 28 successful strikes in his first two seasons). On 5 June 2000, the latter signed him to a seven-year contract worth 1.4 million pesetas over the next seven years.

In 2004, Víctor was deemed surplus to requirements at Villarreal and rejoined Valladolid, teaming up with centre forward Joseba Llorente for three years and netting nine goals to help the side retain their top level status in 2008.

In July 2009, after having once again helped the Castile and León team avoid relegation – 29 games, five goals, 1,956 minutes– Víctor, aged 35, was not offered a new contract and left. The following week he penned a one-year deal with FC Cartagena, recently promoted to division two.

Víctor scored nine league goals for the Murcian side in his first season, improving to 12 in the following as they consecutively managed to stay afloat. In July 2011, the 37-year-old returned to first club Leganés who competed in the third tier, signing for one year.

International
Víctor played one match for Spain, coming on for Luis Enrique in a 0–0 friendly draw with Croatia in Split, on 23 February 2000.

Coaching career
In April 2012, Víctor retired to become Leganés' manager until the end of the campaign. With three wins and a draw, he saved them from relegation to Tercera División.

On 29 June 2015, Víctor returned to third-tier management at his former club Cartagena. His two-year contract ended with his dismissal on 1 February 2016, after seven games without a win.

Honours
Villarreal
UEFA Intertoto Cup: 2003, 2004

References

External links

1974 births
Living people
People from Mérida, Spain
Sportspeople from the Province of Badajoz
Spanish footballers
Footballers from Extremadura
Association football forwards
La Liga players
Segunda División players
Segunda División B players
Real Madrid C footballers
Real Madrid Castilla footballers
CD Tenerife players
CD Toledo players
Real Valladolid players
Villarreal CF players
FC Cartagena footballers
CD Leganés players
Spain international footballers
Spanish football managers
Segunda División B managers
CD Leganés managers
FC Cartagena managers